The 2021 Ladies' National Football League, known for sponsorship reasons as the Lidl Ladies' National Football League, is a ladies' Gaelic football competition taking place in summer 2021. Division placings were the same as for the 2020 competition, which was unfinished due to the COVID-19 pandemic.

Revised fixtures were announced on 6 April 2021, with the tournament taking place in late May and June. Dublin were the winners.

Format

League structure
The 2021 Ladies' National Football League consists of three divisions of eight teams and one of seven. Each division is divided into a North and South section with four teams in each section, except that there are three teams in 4 South. Each team plays every other team in its section once. 3 points are awarded for a win and 1 for a draw.

Tiebreakers for league ranking
If two teams are level on points, the tie-break is:
 winners of the head-to-head game are ranked ahead
 if the head-to-head match was a draw, then whichever team scored more points in the game is ranked ahead (e.g. 1-15 beats 2-12)
 if the head-to-head match was an exact draw, ranking is determined by the points difference (i.e. total scored minus total conceded in all games)
 if the points difference is equal, ranking is determined by the total scored

If three or more teams are level on league points, rankings are determined solely by points difference.

Finals, promotions and relegations
The top two teams in each section in Division 1 contest the Ladies' National Football League semi-finals.

The top two teams in each section in divisions 2, 3 and 4 contest the semi-finals of their respective divisions. The division champions are promoted.

The last-placed teams in each section in divisions 1, 2 and 3 play a relegation playoff against each other, with the losers relegated.

Division 1

Division 1 North

Table

Division 1 South

Table

Division 1 Relegation Playoff

Division 1 Finals

Division 2

Division 2 North

Table

Division 2 South

Table

Division 2 Relegation Playoff

Division 2 Finals

Division 3

Division 3 North

Table

Division 3 South

Table

Division 3 Relegation Playoff

Division 3 Finals

Division 4

Division 4 North

Table

Division 4 South

Table

Division 4 Finals

References

Ladies' National Football League
Ladies' National Football League seasons
Football